The Sheffield-Tuscumbia Twins were a Minor League Baseball team that represented Sheffield, Alabama and Tuscumbia, Alabama in the Tri-State League in 1926.

External links
Baseball Reference

Baseball teams established in 1926
Baseball teams disestablished in 1926
Professional baseball teams in Alabama
Defunct Tri-State League teams
1926 establishments in Alabama
1926 disestablishments in Alabama
Colbert County, Alabama
Defunct baseball teams in Alabama